Jeanie Forrester was Chairman of the Republican Party of New Hampshire and a former Republican member of the New Hampshire Senate, representing the 2nd district from 2010 until 2016. A businesswoman by trade, Forrester served on the Finance and Public/Municipal Affairs committees. In 2016, Forrester decided not to seek reelection to the senate and instead ran for the republican nomination for Governor of New Hampshire, ultimately losing to now-Governor Chris Sununu. Sununu later supported Forrester's successful candidacy for party chairman.

Tenure as New Hampshire Republican State Committee Chairman 
While running for Chairman, Forrester failed to secure a spot on the State Committee from her home County Republican Committee although this did not preclude her from running for Chairman. Forrester was endorsed for the position by then Governor-Elect Chris Sununu and ran unopposed for the position as Chairman. During Forrester's tenure as party chairman she lost 9 out of 11 special elections. As party finances began to become public, Forrester abruptly resigned from the post. It was shown that Forrester's Democratic counterpart had outraised her 9 to 1. At the time of her departure, the New Hampshire Republican State Committee showed a deficit of $29,102.

Personal
Forrester, a native of Michigan, moved to New Hampshire in 1985. After her graduation from the University of New Hampshire, she went to work for then-Governor John H. Sununu. During this time, Forrester earned a Masters in Business Administration from the Whittemore School of Business and Economics.

Political experience
Jeanie Forrester served as a Senator in the New Hampshire State Senate from 2010–2016 Forrester was an unsuccessful candidate in the Republican Primary for Governor of New Hampshire in 2016. She became Chairman of the New Hampshire Republican Party in 2017.

Former legislative committees
Jeanie Forrester was a member of the following committees:
Finance, Member
Public and Municipal Affairs, Vice Chair

Professional experience
Jeanie Forrester has had the following professional experience:
Co-Owner/Chief Executive Officer, Forrester Environmental Services, Incorporated, present
Former Executive Director, Governors Initiatives Program for Excellence in Education, Governor John H. Sununu
Former Legislative Aid, Governor Sununu
Former Town Administrator, Tuftonboro
Former Town Administrator, New Durham
Former Executive Director, Main Street Program, Meredith, New Hampshire
Former Executive Director, Main Street Program, Plymouth, New Hampshire
Former Staff Member, New Hampshire Governor John Sununu
Former Teacher, Business Language, Houston Community College
Former Secretary, Exxon

Elections
2010
Forrester announced her candidacy on April 8, 2010. In the Republican primary in September, she bested incumbent state representative Fran Wendelboe by 911 votes. On election day, which saw a Republican sweep at the state level, Forrester defeated her Democratic opponent, state senator Deborah Reynolds.
2016
Forrester decided not to seek reelection to the senate and instead ran for the Republican nomination for Governor of New Hampshire, ultimately losing to Chris Sununu. Sununu later supported Forrester's successful candidacy for party chairman, a role she assumed in early 2017.

References

External links

|-

1958 births
American city managers
Living people
Republican Party New Hampshire state senators
Place of birth missing (living people)
University of New Hampshire alumni
Women state legislators in New Hampshire
21st-century American politicians
21st-century American women politicians
Candidates in the 2016 United States elections